Vasenino is a rural locality (a village) in Denisovskoye Rural Settlement, Gorokhovetsky District, Vladimir Oblast, Russia. The population was 9 as of 2010.

Geography 
Vasenino is located on the Shumar River, 35 km southwest of Gorokhovets (the district's administrative centre) by road. Veretenkovo is the nearest rural locality.

References 

Rural localities in Gorokhovetsky District